Marco Antonio Peyrot Solís (born 6 May 1966) is a Mexican physician, militar and politician from the National Action Party. From 2006 to 2009 he served as Deputy of the LX Legislature of the Mexican Congress representing Hidalgo.

References

1966 births
Living people
People from Hidalgo (state)
20th-century Mexican physicians
National Action Party (Mexico) politicians
21st-century Mexican politicians
Instituto Politécnico Nacional alumni
Deputies of the LX Legislature of Mexico
Members of the Chamber of Deputies (Mexico) for Hidalgo (state)